The Sylvanus Holbrook House is a historic house at 52 Albee Road in Uxbridge, Massachusetts.  This  story timber-frame house was built c. 1780.  It was owned by Sylvanus Holbrook, one of the founding directors of the Blackstone National Bank.  It is five bays wide, with a central entry that is a typical Federal style with flanking pilasters supporting a five-light transom window and triangular pediment.  Second story windows are butted up to the eave, a common Georgian feature.

The house was listed on the National Register of Historic Places in 1983.

See also
National Register of Historic Places listings in Uxbridge, Massachusetts

References

External links
 Sylvanus Holbrook House MACRIS Listing

Houses in Uxbridge, Massachusetts
National Register of Historic Places in Uxbridge, Massachusetts
Houses on the National Register of Historic Places in Worcester County, Massachusetts